Muppet Babies is an American computer-animated television series featuring toddler versions of the Muppets characters that began airing on Disney Junior and Disney Channel on March 23, 2018 and is aimed at a target audience of children from ages 3 to 8. It is a reboot of the original 1984 animated series of the same name.

The show retains several of the younger incarnations of the classic Muppet characters seen in the previous series, including Kermit the Frog, Miss Piggy, Fozzie Bear, The Great Gonzo, and Animal. The series also sees the second appearance of Nanny (now known as "Mrs. Nanny"), and the first appearance of a new Muppet Babies member named Summer Penguin.

The series finale aired on February 18, 2022.

Plot
The show details Kermit the Frog, Miss Piggy, Summer Penguin, Fozzie Bear, Animal, and The Great Gonzo and a cast of characters using their imaginations.

Episodes

Characters

Main
 Kermit (voiced by Matt Danner) – A level-headed and friendly frog who enjoys acting out adventure and making music with his banjo. However, he can get flustered rather easily, usually by the antics of those around him. Kermit is also the official leader of the Muppet Babies, as he is typically the one who helps devise their plans.
 Piggy (voiced by Melanie Harrison) – A temperamental and self-centered pig who considers herself a star and harbors a crush on Kermit. She mostly speaks in a high-pitched voice but would at times greatly deepen when she gets passionate or angry. She is best friends with Skeeter and Summer.
 Fozzie (voiced by Eric Bauza) – A cheerful and goofy bear who aspires to be a comedian, but also shows skills as a ventriloquist, magician, and a musician like his two best friends, Kermit and Rowlf. While adorable and good-hearted, Fozzie also has a mischievous streak, as he is fond of playing practical jokes on the other Muppets. He can also get frightened rather easily, not sharing Gonzo's love of the paranormal and grotesque.
 Gonzo (voiced by Benjamin Diskin) – An eccentric and unpredictable "whatever" who has a love for anything that can be considered strange, specifically horror movies, works of Gothic fiction, paranormal phenomena, and conspiracy theories, having ideas such as about hippopotamuses having their own language. 
 Animal (voiced by Dee Bradley Baker) – An excitable frenzied monster who likes playing the drums.
 Summer (voiced by Jessica DiCicco) – A good-hearted and sweet-natured penguin from the South Pole who loves to make art. She is best friends with Piggy.
 Miss Nanny (voiced by Jenny Slate) – The teacher of the Muppet Babies and proprietor of her school who is only seen from the neck down. The pattern on her stockings changes to reflect relevant elements in the episode plot. She won a gold medal in a gymnastics discipline at the Sport-A-Thon. In episode 69a ("A Mitzvah for Mrs. Nanny"), it is revealed that Miss Nanny is Jewish, and actually the daughter of Nanny from the original series.

Other Muppets
 Camilla (vocal effects provided by Melanie Harrison) – A white chick and Gonzo's best friend who is involved with the Muppet Babies' activities.
 Mr. Statler and Mr. Waldorf (voiced by Eric Bauza and Matt Danner respectively) – The neighbors of Mrs. Nanny who often comment about the Muppet Babies' activities from the balcony of their home.
 Rizzo (voiced by Benjamin Diskin) – A self-centered and sarcastic rat who lives in the mouse hole in the school. 
 Bunsen Honeydew (voiced by Eric Bauza) – A young aspiring scientist.
 Beaker (voiced by Matt Danner) – Bunsen’s assistant.
 Dr. Teeth (performed by Bill Barretta) – The band leader of the Electric Mayhem. He appeared in a live-action transmission in "Muppet Rock" where he saw Animal perform backstage and is interested in having him join the Electric Mayhem. Animal turns him down for now as he needs to continue practicing.
 Rowlf (voiced by Matt Danner) – A fun-loving and friendly dog who loves to sing and make music, typically with his piano.  He is best friends with Kermit and Fozzie, often acting as the middleman between the two.
 Sweetums (voiced by Dee Bradley Baker) – An ogre who lives next door to the school.
 Chef (voiced by Matt Danner) – A mock Swedish-speaking cooking prodigy.
 Robin (voiced by Eric Bauza) – A small polliwog who is Kermit's nephew. He has a tail due to being in his tadpole state.
 Scooter (voiced by Ogie Banks) – A young boy who wears a green and yellow track jacket.
 Skeeter (voiced by Cree Summer) – Scooter's athletic twin sister who wears a sports-inspired purple jacket, a baseball-shaped watch, and pig tails.
 Sam (voiced by Eric Bauza) – An eagle. In this show, Sam is shown to fly.
 Jill (voiced by Ashley Spillers) - A female frog from across the street who occasionally visits the other Muppet Babies.
 Pepe (voiced by Benjamin Diskin) - A prawn that appeared in Scooter's video game.
 The Newsman (voiced by Matt Danner) - A news anchor.

Other characters
 Priscilla (vocal effects provided by Dee Bradley Baker) – One of Camilla's fellow chicks who is yellow.
 Beep – One of Camilla's fellow chicks who is brown and makes the sound of a car horn instead of clucking.
 Carlos (voiced by Todrick Hall) - A blue frog that appears in "Frogs of a Feather". In "Frog Scouts", Carlos becomes part of the Frog Scouts alongside Kermit and Robin.
 Mr. Manny (voiced by Dulé Hill) - A friend of Miss Nanny's and the Substitute teacher of the kids when Miss Nanny is unavailable. Like Miss Nanny, his head is never shown. Mr. Manny is known for his catchphrase where he states that a certain thing "is groovy" which is always accompanied by Mr. Manny doing horizontal gestures with his hands, bending his knees, and doing a motion that has him wiggle his hips. He is also shown to be a volunteer at the local library and the scout troop leader of the Frog Scouts.
 Orville H. Octopus (voiced by Dee Bradley Baker in "The Card Shark", Matt Danner in "Frog Scouts") - An animated purple octopus that appeared in the Muppet Babies' fantasies.
 Rozzie (voiced by Charlie Townsend) - A young koala who is Fozzie's adopted younger sister.

Side characters 

 Dot the Dragon as Rachel Bloom
 Hug-a-Saurus as Matt Danner
 Vinny Lingunie as John Deluca
 Blerph as Matt Danner
 Bombo as Maxwell Mitchell
 Dust bunnies as Dee Bradley Baker
 Meatball Monster as Dee Bradley Baker
 Mega Super Ultra Robo Space Dinosaur as Ben Diskin
 Nanny as Barbara Billingsley
 Phineas T. Cup as Dee Bradley Baker
 Potato
 Reporter Bob as Dee Bradley Baker
 Uncle Norman as Ben Diskin
 Wacky Alpaca Pals as Dee Bradley Baker as Melanie Harrison
 Dinosaur as Dee Bradley Baker
 Sarcophagus as Ben Diskin
 Zorna club as Dee Bradley Baker
 The "Bad Eggs" team as Ben Diskin
 Bunsen honeydew and Beaker 2.0 as Eric Bauza as Matt Danner
 The babies discover Planet Gonzo as Ben Diskin
 Summers Grandparents as Dee Bradley Baker

Production
Unlike the previous series, the update is produced using computer-generated animation and features two 11-minute stories per episode. The series is aimed at children between the ages of four and seven.

Tom Warburton, best known for creating Cartoon Network's Codename: Kids Next Door, is the executive producer and Eric Shaw, former writer on Nickelodeon's SpongeBob SquarePants, is the story editor and co-producer. The show is a co-production between Disney Junior, Odd Bot Animation, Snowball Studios and The Muppets Studio.

Production lawsuit
On October 23, 2020, it was reported that original Muppet Babies writer Jeffrey Scott would sue The Walt Disney Company for using ideas that originated in the 1984 series without permission or credit. Scott also stated that he presented ideas and concepts to Disney in 2016 that were used without his permission. On January 27, 2021, Disney filed a motion to dismiss it. Disney argued that Scott had no legal grounds to sue because his ownership to the copyright had ceased when he filed for bankruptcy in 2003. The case was dismissed without prejudice on March 31, 2021.

However, in September 2022, a U.S. district judge declined Disney's request to officially dismiss the case, finding Disney had allegedly copied elements from Scott's production bible. Among the presented evidence was the "nanny character with her distinctive colored socks" and similarly-themed episodes between the original series and the reboot.

Broadcast
The series premiered on Disney Junior on March 23, 2018 in the United States, the following day in Canada, and in Mexico on June 10.

On September 7, 2018, it was renewed for a second season which premiered 11 months later on August 9, 2019. On July 25, 2019, it was renewed for a third and final season, which premiered on January 4, 2021.

Ratings
 
}}

Awards and nominations

References

External links

2018 American television series debuts
2022 American television series endings
2010s American animated television series
2020s American animated television series
The Muppets television series
Disney Junior original programming
American children's animated adventure television series
American children's animated comedy television series
American children's animated fantasy television series
American children's animated musical television series
American computer-animated television series
American preschool education television series
American television series with live action and animation
Animated television series reboots
Animated television series about children
Animated preschool education television series
2010s preschool education television series
2020s preschool education television series
Disney animated television series
Child versions of cartoon characters
English-language television shows
Television series by Disney
Children's and Family Emmy Award winners